Pseudomyrophis frio is an eel in the family Ophichthidae (worm/snake eels). It was described by David Starr Jordan and Bradley Moore Davis in 1891, originally under the genus Myrophis. It is a marine, tropical eel which is known from the southwestern Atlantic Ocean.

References

Fish described in 1891
frio
Taxa named by David Starr Jordan